Byneset is a former municipality in Sør-Trøndelag county, Norway.  The  municipality existed from 1838 until its dissolution in 1964.  The municipality of Byneset encompassed the western part of what is now Trondheim municipality in Trøndelag county.  Byneset was located along an arm of the Trondheimsfjord and it was separated from the city of Trondheim by the Bymarka recreation area.  The local Byneset Church is one of the oldest stone churches in Norway.  The largest village in Byneset was Spongdal which was the administrative centre of the municipality.  Other villages included Byneset and Langørjan.

History

The municipality of Byneset was established on 1 January 1838 (see formannskapsdistrikt). According to the 1835 census, there were 2,143 people living in Byneset.  In 1855, the southern parish of Buvik (population: 841) was separated from Byneset to form its own municipality.  This left Byneset with a population of 2,109.

During the 1960s, there were many municipal mergers across Norway due to the work of the Schei Committee. On 1 January 1964, the neighboring municipalities of Byneset (population: 2,049), Leinstrand (population: 4,193), Strinda (population: 44,600), Tiller (population: 3,595), and the city of Trondheim (population: 56,982) were merged to form the new urban municipality of Trondheim which would have a total population of 111,419.

Name
The municipality is named Bynes or Byneset since this has been the name for the area since the mid-1400s. The first element is the name of the old By farm which means "farm". The last element is the old name (1400s and earlier) for the medeival parish for this area, which is the word for "headland" (because this area is located on a headland between the Trondheimsfjorden and Gaulosen fjord.

Government
While it existed, this municipality was responsible for primary education (through 10th grade), outpatient health services, senior citizen services, unemployment, social services, zoning, economic development, and municipal roads. During its existence, this municipality was governed by a municipal council of elected representatives, which in turn elected a mayor.

Mayors
The mayors of Byneset:

 1838–1841: Christian Petersen
 1842–1845: Christen Larsen Rye
 1846–1849: Johan Lausen Koren Dahl
 1850–1851: Christen Monsen Hangeraas
 1852–1852: Lars Ingebretsen Skjøstad
 1852–1859: Christen Larsen Rye
 1860–1863: Lars Christensen Gaustad
 1864–1871: Anders Olsen Vorset
 1872–1873: Ingebrigt Andersen Brendsel
 1874–1877: Ole Knutsen Haugan
 1878–1887: Lars Christensen Gaustad (V)
 1888–1893: Anders Larsen Bodsberg
 1894–1897: Ole Larsen Risstad (H)
 1898-1898: Ole Larsen Engen (V)
 1899–1901: Ole Larsen Risstad (H)
 1902–1907: Ole Gudmundsen Frøseth (V)
 1908–1919: Ole Larsen Engen (V)
 1920–1925: Ole Knutsen Rye (LL)
 1926–1934: Axel Høyem (Bp)
 1935–1940: Elling Larsen Opland (Bp)
 1941–1945: Anders Skogstad (NS)
 1945–1947: Elling Larsen Opland (Bp)
 1948–1953: Lars Olsen Gaustad (Bp)
 1954–1959: Kristoffer Rye (Bp)
 1960–1963: Kristen Løvseth (Bp)

Municipal council
The municipal council  of Byneset was made up of 17 representatives that were elected to four year terms. The party breakdown of the final municipal council was as follows:

References

Former municipalities of Norway
Geography of Trondheim
1838 establishments in Norway
1964 disestablishments in Norway